John Pollard may refer to:

Politicians
 John Pollard (speaker) (died 1557), Speaker of the British House of Commons
 John Pollard (died 1575), MP for Plympton Erle, Barnstaple, Exeter and Grampound
 John Garland Pollard (1871–1937), American politician who served as governor of Virginia, 1930–1934
 John Pollard (politician), former Northwest Territories MLA and Mayor of Hay River

Others
 John Pollard (footballer) (born 1971), English footballer
 John Pollard (mathematician) (born 1941), British mathematician
 John Pollard (priest) (fl. 1544–1554), Archdeacon of Barnstaple
 John Pollard (Royal Navy officer) (1787–1868), credited with killing the Frenchman who shot Nelson
 John Pollard (writer) (born 1914), English writer
 John Beverly Pollard (1880–1960), US Navy captain and college football player
 John D. Pollard (born 1941), professor of neurology at the University of Sydney
 John F. Pollard (born 1944), British historian
 J. W. H. Pollard (John William Hobbs Pollard, 1872–1957), American football player and coach
 Red Pollard (John Pollard, 1909–1981), Canadian–American jockey and founding member of the Jockeys' Guild
 Jack Pollard (1926–2002), Australian sportswriter

See also
 Jon Pollard (disambiguation)
 Jonathan Pollard (born 1954), civilian defense analyst convicted of espionage for Israel
 John Pollard Seddon (1827–1906), architect